The Game Plan was an Australian sports television program, that focused on the National Rugby League competition. It aired on One every Thursday night.

Broadcast history
The show premiered on One on 10 March 2011, airing at 8:30pm in front of a live studio audience.

The show moved to its larger sister channel, Network Ten, on 21 June 2012 to target a broader audience. It aired in New South Wales and Queensland at 8:30pm, airing the same night on One at 10:30pm in Victoria, South Australia and Western Australia.

When the program returned in 2013, it went back to screening on One at the earlier time of 7:30pm and the studio audience removed from broadcasts. In October 2013, The Game Plan was axed by One, with the news being announced on 2GB.

Hosts
 Steve Roach
 Andrew Moore
 Joel Caine

See also
 List of Australian television series

References

Network 10 original programming
10 Bold original programming
2011 Australian television series debuts
2013 Australian television series endings
English-language television shows
Australian sports television series
Rugby league television shows
Television articles with incorrect naming style